Raising My Own Hell is an EP released by British recording artist Toby Jepson on 2 December 2013.  The tracks were all recorded in Scarborough at Jepson's home studio and feature Jepson on vocals and guitars, Dave Kemp on saxophone and accordion, Matt E on drums and Roger Davies on bass.

Track listing

Notes
 "Four Letter Word" was written for Katie Melua's Ketevan album but was unused.
 "Shadow Boxing" is best described as a swing track which showcases Jepson's vocals and the skills of Dave Kemp.

References

2013 EPs